Birgit Kowalczik (born 21 October 1967) is a German swimmer. She competed in two events at the 1984 Summer Olympics representing West Germany.

References

1967 births
Living people
German female swimmers
Olympic swimmers of West Germany
Swimmers at the 1984 Summer Olympics
Sportspeople from Cologne